And Atoll Biosphere Reserve is a Biosphere reserve located in the Federated States of Micronesia (FSM).

UNESCO description 
And Atoll is biologically and topographically representative of a vast majority of the atolls around Federated States of Micronesia (FSM). It is the most biologically diverse and undisturbed atoll in Pohnpei, Pohnpei's number one marine Area of Biological Significance (ABS) and one of the identified 24 “Priority Action Areas” in the Eco-regional Plan under the National Biodiversity Strategic Action Plan (NBSAP).

Key information 
 Declaration Date: 2007
 Surface Area: 950 ha
 Administrative Division: And Biosphere Reserve ABR committee

Ecological characteristics 

And Atoll is biologically and topographically representative of a vast majority of the atolls around Federated States of Micronesia (FSM).

It is the most biologically diverse and undisturbed atoll in Pohnpei, Pohnpei's number one marine Area of Biological Significance (ABS) and one of the identified 24 “Priority Action Areas” in the Eco-regional Plan under the National Biodiversity Strategic Action Plan (NBSAP).

The proposal to make a Biosphere Reserve presents an opportunity to create a model of sustainability. The relationship between the dynamic human economic system and the larger dynamic, but slower changing, ecological system, can support prosperous local initiatives indefinitely.

Done within the bounds of the atoll environment, as to not destroy the diversity, complexity and function of the ecological system, And atoll can stand as an example to the many other islands and atolls of Micronesia and the Pacific. And Atoll consists of thirteen low-lying, forested islets encircling a  lagoon.

Human activities 
Capacity building, fishery/fisheries, forestry, hunting, local participation, recreation, tourism.

There is a very small permanent, part-time population of caretakers on the island itself; therefore there is a very small human ecological footprint on the atoll.

However, there is a more significant population within the transition zone on the southwestern coast of Pohnpei Island.

See also 
 World Network of Biosphere Reserves in Asia and the Pacific
 Utwe

References

External links 
 Webpage for the And Atoll Biosphere Reserve on the Protected Planet website

Biosphere reserves of Micronesia